Ian Owen (born 21 July 1948) is a former Australian rules football player who played in the VFL between 1969 and 1972 for the Richmond Football Club.

Owen played in the 1966 senior premiership side for Echuca East, three  premiership sides at Richmond (Under 19s, Seniors then Reserves) and in three senior premiership teams for Port Melbourne in the VFA.

In the 1969 Grand Final, Owen's Richmond guernsey carried the number 52. There is no record of any Grand Final player carrying a larger number until Adelaide's Shaun Rehn in 1997 and 1998.

References 
 Hogan P: The Tigers Of Old, Richmond FC, Melbourne 1996

External links
 
 

Living people
Richmond Football Club players
Richmond Football Club Premiership players
Port Melbourne Football Club players
1948 births
Australian rules footballers from Victoria (Australia)
One-time VFL/AFL Premiership players